Blue Plate Special is a jazz studio album by Will Bernard recorded and released in 2008. The recording includes jazz-funk musicians Will Bernard on guitar, Stanton Moore (of Galactic) on drums, John Medeski (of Medeski, Martin and Wood) on keyboards and Andy Hess (of Gov't Mule) on bass.

Track listing
 "Baby Goats" - 5:22
 "Magpie" - 5:19
 "Blue Plate Special" - 5:20
 "571" - 6:00
 "Blister" - 6:31
 "Gen Pop" - 5:28
 "Awanna" - 4:05
 "Fast Fun" - 4:19
 "Frontwinder" - 5:25
 "Gonzo" - 4:13
 "How Great Thou Art" - 3:59

References

2008 albums
Will Bernard albums